is a town located in Asakuchi District, Okayama Prefecture, Japan.

 the town has an estimated population of 11,204 and a density of 920 persons per km². The total area is 12.23 km².

Industries include food processing factories (Amano Foods), electronics (Sharp), medicines (Fusso) etc.

Geography

Neighbouring municipalities 

 Asakuchi
 Kasaoka
In 2005, it declined to amalgamate with the neighboring towns of Kamogata and Yorishima to form the city of Asakuchi.

Transportation

Railway 

 JR West
 San'yo Main Line: Satoshō

Notable people
Fujii Kaze, singer-songwriter
Yoshio Nishina, former physicist
Gōtarō Ogawa, former economist, educator, politician and cabinet minister

References

External links

Satoshō official website 

Towns in Okayama Prefecture